"Vila Velebita" (often translated as 'Fairy of Velebit') is a Croatian patriotic song. It originates from the second half of the 19th century, after the Illyrian movement. Its earliest recorded public performance was in 1882 in Zagreb, on the Croatian singing society "Kolo"'s twentieth anniversary party.

The first recording of the lyrics and the melody dates from 1893, when Vjekoslav Klaić recorded it in the Hrvatska pjesmarica (lit. Croatian Songbook). He wrote down the first verse based on Vjenceslav Novak's rendition of how the people of Senj sang it. The original author remains unknown, but it was sometimes ascribed to the poets Danilo Medić or to Lavoslav Vukelić, while some sources claim the melody was written by the composer Mijo Majer.

While vila is often translated as "fairy" (as below), vilas are supernatural beings in Slavic folklore quite different from English fairies.

Lyrics

See also
Velebitska Vila

Sources
Vladimir Jagarić: Dileme oko nastanka popijevke "Vila Velebita", Hrvatski planinar 84 (1992), p11-12

Croatian patriotic songs
19th-century songs
Year of song unknown
Songwriter unknown